The 1899 Cincinnati football team was an American football team that represented the University of Cincinnati as an independent during the 1899 college football season. In their first season under head coach Daniel A. Reed, the Bearcats compiled a 5–2 record. Howard Nieman was the team captain. The team played its home games at Union Ball Park in Cincinnati.

Schedule

References

Cincinnati
Cincinnati Bearcats football seasons
Cincinnati football